The women's team pursuit speed skating competition of the Vancouver 2010 Olympics was held at Richmond Olympic Oval on 26 and 27 February 2010.

Records
Prior to this competition, the existing world and Olympic records were as follows.

Results

Bracket

Quarterfinals

Semifinals

Finals

References

External links
 
 

Women's speed skating at the 2010 Winter Olympics